The March 1874 Galway Borough by-election was held on 20 March 1874.  The byelection was held due to the succession to a peerage of the incumbent Home Rule MP, William St Lawrence.  It was won by the Home Rule candidate Frank Hugh O'Donnell.

References

Politics of Galway (city)
1874 elections in the United Kingdom
By-elections to the Parliament of the United Kingdom in County Galway constituencies
1874 elections in Ireland